Egeria (minor planet designation: 13 Egeria) is a large main-belt G-type asteroid. It was discovered by Annibale de Gasparis on November 2, 1850. Egeria was named by Urbain Le Verrier, whose computations led to the discovery of Neptune, after the mythological nymph Egeria of Aricia, Italy, the wife of Numa Pompilius, second king of Rome.

Egeria occulted a star on January 8, 1992. Its disc was determined to be quite circular (217×196 km). On January 22, 2008, it occulted another star, and this occultation was timed by several observers in New Mexico and Arizona, coordinated by the IOTA Asteroid Occultation Program. The result showed that Egeria presented an approximately circular profile to Earth of 214.8×192 km, well in agreement with the 1992 occultation. It has also been studied by radar.

In 1988 a search for satellites or dust orbiting this asteroid was performed using the UH88 telescope at the Mauna Kea Observatories, but the effort came up empty. Spectral analysis of Egeria shows it to be unusually high in water content, 10.5–11.5% water by mass. This makes Egeria a prominent candidate for future water-mining ventures.

See also
 Former classification of planets

Notes

References

External links 
  (displays Elong from Sun and V mag for 2011)
 
 

000013
Discoveries by Annibale de Gasparis
Named minor planets
000013
000013
000013
18501102